Andrew Lyon Watson (born 3 April 1967) is an English former professional footballer who played in the Football League for Exeter City. A defender, he began his career with Huddersfield Town, but never played for their league team, and went on to play non-League football for Mossley and Emley. He was commercial manager of Mossley before taking up executive roles at Everton and Burnley and as a director of Huddersfield Town.

References 

Living people
1967 births
Footballers from Huddersfield
English footballers
Association football defenders
Huddersfield Town A.F.C. players
Exeter City F.C. players
Mossley A.F.C. players
Wakefield F.C. players
English Football League players
Huddersfield Town A.F.C. non-playing staff